muCommander is a lightweight, open-source, cross-platform file manager that runs on operating systems supporting Java. It has a Norton Commander style, dual-pane interface to allow manipulation of files via keyboard shortcuts. Pre-compiled builds are available for Mac OS X, Microsoft Windows, Linux, Solaris, FreeBSD, and OpenVMS. The software runs from the Internet via Java Web Start.

Features 
 File copy, move, rename, batch rename, and email
 Works on local file volumes, FTP, SFTP, SMB, NFS, HTTP, Amazon S3, Hadoop HDF5, and Bonjour
 Supports ZIP, RAR, 7z, Tar, Gzip, BZip2, ISO/NRG, AR/Deb, and LST archives
 Supports Dropbox and Google Drive
 ZIP file modification
 File split and combine
 Change permissions and date of files
 Calculate files checksums in MD5, CRC32, SHA, SHA-256, SHA-384, SHA-512, Adler32, andMD2
 Full keyboard access

See also 

 Comparison of file managers

References

External links
 

Free file managers
Free FTP clients
Files transferred over shell clients
GNU Project software
Orthodox file managers